The Best of Breed is a compilation album released by MC Breed. It peaked at number 66 on Billboard magazine's Top R&B/Hip-Hop Albums chart in the U.S.

Track listing
"Ain't No Future in Yo' Frontin'"- 4:00
"Gotta Get Mine"- 4:17
"Everyday Ho"- 3:49
"Well Alright"- 5:08
"Seven Years"- 4:06
"Late Nite Creep (Booty Call)"- 4:56
"Aquapussy"- 4:10
"Tight"- 5:06
"Ain't Too Much Worried"- 5:24
"Just Kickin' It"- 3:54
"Game for Life"- 3:14
"Real MC"- 4:02
"Teach My Kids"- 4:17
"This Is How We Do It"- 5:07

References

MC Breed albums
1995 greatest hits albums